Dr. Anand Prakash Maheshwari He is an IPS officer of 1984 batch, Uttar Pradesh cadre. His professional career as a soldier and policeman culminated as the Head of the largest paramilitary force in the world - The Central Reserve Police Force. Post retirement, he was appointed as the Advisor to Hon'ble  Lieutenant Governor, Puducherry.
He worked in this capacity till the formation of the State government.

Education
An alumnus of Sri Ram College of Commerce, Maheshwari post graduated as MBA, ACS and ACWA before getting inducted into IPS. He later on, during the service, completed his Doctorate (Ph.D) in Sociology on the subject ‘Management of Communal Violence-Social Conflict Resolution’.

Career
Maheshwari has spent a sizable segment of his professional career in Uttar Pradesh working as Police Chief in towns of Moradabad, Kanpur, Allahabad and Gorakhpur and also headed Law & Order as well as Vigilance wings of UP Police.  He has also worked in Intelligence, Security, Economic Offences, CID, Training & Human Rights divisions of the State Police.  He has worked with CRPF on counter insurgency grids of Assam, Kashmir and the states affected by left wing extremism.  He has worked in BSF as ADG, BSF Academy/Training and SDG Operations. He has also served as the Director General of Bureau of Police Research & Development, New Delhi and as the Special Secretary (Internal Security), in the Ministry of Home Affairs, Government of India.

Specializations
Dr. Maheshwari has done specializations in a range of subjects that include leadership, inter personal relationship, human rights, communal harmony, besides Police Operations from reputed institutions that include London Business School, IIM Ahmadabad, IIPA New Delhi and National Police Academy, Hyderabad.  In addition, he has gained rich experience in diverse policing domains which range from Counter Insurgency, Homeland Security, Crisis Management, Correctional Administration  and Community Policing to Border management.
 
As part of his self internalization process, he has undergone some intrinsic programs on ‘Inner Engineering’ and ‘Bhav Spandan’ from the Isha Foundation, Coimbatore as well as on ‘ Yoga and Naturopathy as a Way of Life’ from the Haridwar-based Patanjali Yoga Peeth.

Decorations
Dr Maheshwari is the humble awardee of a number of eminent recognitions which include the prestigious President’s Police Medal for Distinguished Service, Police Medal for Gallantry and Police Medal for Meritorious Service. As Head of CRPF, he was also felicitated by President of India on behalf of ECI for excellence in security management during General Elections.

Community Connect
Striking a decent balance between official life and social responsibility as a citizen, he put his activity based services in the assembly line of many NGOs that included ANKUR, AIHASAS (UP), ARUSHI (New Delhi), and RAHAT GHAR project of Jammu & Kashmir for the cause of neglected segments of society such as street children, orphans and widows of militancy, drug addicts and senior citizens.  It was with a clear mission to bring them out of the shadows of abandoned humanity and channelize socio-economic efforts for their betterment.

Creativeness
Staying aligned to the core elements for a blissful sustenance, he has also delved in the varied fields of photography, rural craft, creativity from waste and organic farming with his fondness rooted in his childhood connect with villages in Rajasthan, ‘Kadel’ in particular.

Literary life
Penning down his well analysed real life experiences, Dr. Maheshwari has authored more than a dozen books, the latest one being "HUKUM"- 2020 (LiFi Publications, New Delhi), focusing on some poignant facets of human life. A recipient of the prestigious Govind Ballav Pant Award, his books and anthologies have been fore-worded by luminaries like Dr. APJ Abdul Kalam, former President of India, Ved Marwah, former Governor of Manipur, Gen. V K Singh, former Army Chief, Ruskin Bond, renowned litterateur and Kuldeep Nayar and Chandan Mitra, well known journalists.
He has devoted two books each to the subjects of Communalism, Insurgency and Cancer patients. "Into the Oblivion" is a touching narrative on the real-life story of a cancer patient with beaming sidelights on life style management and tips for the care takers. He has also dedicated one book each to old age ( Salt ‘n’ Pepper) and childhood memories in the eponymous ‘Childhood Nostalgia’.
Equally at ease with English and Hindi, he has also published more than 40 articles in reputed newspapers and journals like Times of India, Hindustan Times, Indian Police Journal and National Police Academy Journal.

References

1961 births
Living people
Indian civil servants
Indian police officers
Delhi University alumni